The 1981 Columbia Lions football team was an American football team that represented Columbia University during the 1981 NCAA Division I-A football season. Columbia tied for last place in the Ivy League. 

In their second season under head coach Bob Naso, the Lions compiled a 1–9 record and were outscored 243 to 116. Vince Pellini and Tom McNally were the team captains.  

The Lions' 1–6 conference record tied for seventh in the Ivy League standings. Columbia was outscored 160 to 93 by Ivy opponents. 

This would be Columbia's last season in the NCAA's top level of football competition. Shortly after the season ended, the NCAA reassigned all of the Ivy League teams to the second-tier Division I-AA, which would later be renamed the Football Championship Subdivision.

Columbia played its home games at Baker Field in Upper Manhattan, in New York City.

Schedule

References

Columbia
Columbia Lions football seasons
Columbia Lions football